Daria Belyakina (born 16 September 1986) is a Russian swimmer. She competed at two Olympics, in the 200 m and 400 m freestyle and the 4 × 100 m freestyle at the 2008 Summer Olympics and in the 4 × 200 metre freestyle relay event at the 2012 Summer Olympics.

References

1986 births
Living people
Russian female swimmers
Olympic swimmers of Russia
Swimmers at the 2008 Summer Olympics
Swimmers at the 2012 Summer Olympics
Medalists at the FINA World Swimming Championships (25 m)
European Aquatics Championships medalists in swimming
Universiade gold medalists for Russia
Universiade silver medalists for Russia
Universiade medalists in swimming
Medalists at the 2013 Summer Universiade
Russian female freestyle swimmers